Nathan Sykes (born 8 September 1974) is an English former professional rugby league footballer who played in the 1990s and 2000s.

Playing career

Representative career
Sykes won caps for England, playing against France in 1999, and against Wales in 2001. He represented Yorkshire whilst at Castleford Tigers playing as an interchange/substitute, i.e. number 16, in the 18-22 defeat by Lancashire at Central Park, Wigan on Friday 14 June 2002.

Club career
Sykes played for Moldgreen ARLFC before playing professionally for the Castleford Tigers in the Super League. Sykes made his debut for Castleford Tigers in 1991, and then played for Castleford for fourteen seasons. Nathan Sykes made his debut for Featherstone Rovers on Sunday 13 February 2005.

Family 
Nathan Sykes has a wife called Sarah, and two daughters called Bella and Olivia

References

1974 births
Living people
Castleford Tigers players
England national rugby league team players
English rugby league players
Featherstone Rovers captains
Featherstone Rovers players
Great Britain under-21 national rugby league team players
Rugby league props
Rugby league second-rows
Yorkshire rugby league team players